"48 Crash" is Suzi Quatro's third solo single and was released after "Can the Can". It was included on her debut album Suzi Quatro (known as Can the Can in Australia). It later appeared as a track on her 1995 album What Goes Around. The single peaked at number three in the UK in July 1973, and number one in Australia for one week. It also hit number two in Germany, and charted well in other European countries.

Background
This Quatro's third solo single was released after she moved from the United States to Britain. In the United States she had already released two singles with all-female band The Pleasure Seekers.

The song "48 Crash" was written and produced by Mike Chapman and Nicky Chinn. The song "Little Bitch Blue" was written by Quatro and Len Tuckey and produced by Mike Chapman and Nicky Chinn.

The song has long been assumed to be about andropause. However, according to the British writer D. J. Taylor, one alternative theory is that, having boasted of their ability to write "a song about anything", Chapman and Chinn were issued with the challenge to come up with a treatment of the 1848 United States economic crisis.

Charts

Weekly charts

Year-end charts

Year-end charts

See also
List of number-one singles in Australia during the 1970s

References

1973 singles
1973 songs
Number-one singles in Australia
RAK Records singles
Song recordings produced by Mike Chapman
Songs written by Mike Chapman
Songs written by Nicky Chinn
Suzi Quatro songs